Junior Varsity or variation, may refer to:

 Junior varsity team (sports)
 The Junior Varsity, American rock band
 Junior Varsity (EP), a 2000 EP by Say Anything

See also

Junior (disambiguation)
Varsity (disambiguation)
JV (disambiguation)